Dalla oxaites is a species of butterfly in the family Hesperiidae. It is found in Bolivia and possibly Peru.

References

Butterflies described in 1923
oxaites